Tempus fugit is a Latin expression meaning "time flees". It may also refer to:
"Tempus Fugit" aka "Tempus Fugue-it," a jazz composition by pianist Bud Powell
"Tempus Fugit" (song), by progressive rock band Yes from their 1980 album Drama
"Tempus Fugit," a Watopia island route on the cycling App Zwift.
"Tempus Fugit" (The X-Files), an episode in season four of the American TV series, The X-Files
"Tempus Fugit" (2003 film), a 2003 film by Enric Folch

See also
Time Flies (disambiguation)